Nikodem Fiedosewicz (born 30 May 1998) is a Polish professional footballer who plays as a left-back or a left midfielder for Polish club Pogoń Siedlce.

Career statistics

Club

References

External links

1998 births
Living people
People from Grodzisk Wielkopolski
Polish footballers
Association football midfielders
Warta Poznań players
MKP Pogoń Siedlce players
III liga players
II liga players
I liga players
Ekstraklasa players